Malawi's former President Bakili Muluzi continued the pro-Western foreign policy established by his predecessor, Hastings Banda. It maintains excellent diplomatic relations with principal Western countries. Malawi's close relations with South Africa throughout the apartheid era strained its relations with other African nations. Following the collapse of apartheid in 1994, Malawi developed, and currently maintains, strong diplomatic relations with all African countries.

Bilateral donors

Important bilateral donors include Canada, Denmark, Germany, Ireland, Iceland, Japan, South Korea, the Netherlands, Norway, Sweden, Republic of China (Taiwan), the United Kingdom, and the United States. Multilateral donors include the World Bank, the International Monetary Fund, the European Union, the African Development Bank, and the United Nations organizations.

SADC

Malawi assumed the chair of the Southern African Development Community (SADC) in 2001. Muluzi took an active role in SADC on issues such as the global coalition against terrorism and land reform in Zimbabwe.

ACP

Malawi has been a member of the ACP group since Lomé I and is also a party to the Cotonou agreement, the partnership agreement between the European Community/European Union and 77 states from Africa, the Caribbean and the Pacific.

Memberships in international organizations

Malawi is a member of the following international organizations: the Commonwealth of Nations, the United Nations and some of its specialized and related agencies (i.e. UNCTAD, UNESCO, UNIDO), IMF, World Bank, Multilateral Investment Guarantee Agency (MIGA), World Intellectual Property Organization (WIPO), Berne Convention, Universal Copyright Convention, Organization of African Unity (OAU), Common Market for Eastern and Southern Africa, Lome Convention, African Development Bank (AFDB), Southern African Development Community (SADC), the Common Market for East and Southern Africa (COMESA), Non-Aligned Movement, G-77, and the World Health Organization (WHO).

Malawi is also a member of the International Criminal Court with a Bilateral Immunity Agreement of protection for the US-military (as covered under Article 98).

Bilateral Relations

Malawi and the Commonwealth of Nations

Malawi became a full member of the Commonwealth on independence from the United Kingdom in 1964. Queen Elizabeth II, Head of the Commonwealth, was Queen of Malawi, represented by the Governor-General of Malawi, until the country became a republic in the Commonwealth of Nations in 1966, when the then Prime Minister of Malawi, Hastings Banda, declared himself the first President of Malawi.

See also

List of diplomatic missions in Malawi
List of diplomatic missions of Malawi

References

 
Malawi and the Commonwealth of Nations